The North Otago Rugby Football Union (NORFU) is a New Zealand rugby union province based in Oamaru and compete in the Heartland Championship. They are one of the strongest teams in The Heartland Championship, winning the Meads Cup section of the competition in its second year, 2007 as well as 2010. Their home ground is Whitestone Contracting Stadium, formerly Centennial Park.

The North Otago Rugby Football Union was founded in 1927 and over the years they have had many highs and lows.  In 1930 they hosted the All Blacks before the first test against the British and Irish Lions, In 1962 they hosted and beat Australia during their tour of New Zealand. In the NPC they had sat near the bottom of the third division table until they beat Horowhenua-Kapiti Rugby Football Union in the final in 2002 and moved to the second division where they were regular semi-finalists.

In the 2006 Heartland Championship they lost the Meads Cup semi-final to Wairarapa Bush Rugby Football Union after being pre-tournament favourites. In 2007 they won the Meads Cup after

In the 2010 competition they won the Meads Cup final 39–18 at home against Wanganui.

History
The North Otago Rugby Football Union was formed in 1904 but didn't join the NZRFU until 1927. In 1930 North Otago played the All Blacks at the Oamaru Showgrounds before the All Blacks first test against the British and Irish Lions, however North Otago lost 6-34. 1946 saw the first Hanan Shield fixture with a 6–9 loss against South Canterbury. In 1947 North Otago had two Ranfurly Shield challenges but both were unsuccessful. 1962 saw the province record a fantastic win over Australia 14-13 and another win against Southland 19-8 but then a narrow loss to Otago 14–11. In 1965 North Otago produced some magic rugby to beat Otago 18–11. The highlight of the 1971 season was the selection of Kurow's Phil Gard for the All Blacks, fourth test against the Lions at Eden Park. The 1980s were unsuccessful years as North Otago won very few games.
 The highlight of the early 1990s was a Ranfurly Shield challenge in 1993 when Auckland brought the trophy on tour. The crowd went delirious after 5 minutes when Brent McEwan scored a try from a set move to give North Otago a 5–0 lead. However, the talent of Auckland then shone through and they scored 139 unanswered points. John Kirwan scored eight tries. The 1997 season proved to be a fairytale effort with the team having its best season yet in NPC rugby. The side finished as top qualifier, won its home semi final and went down to in the final.
 1998 saw North Otago lose only two of its nine games. North Otago was now winning more games in a season than it used to win in a decade. A lot of the credit for the massive resurgence in North Otago rugby during this period must go to the outstanding coaches, Greg Shipton and Peter Cook. In 2000, Glenn Moore took over the reins with Paddy Stewart. Moore, a former Mid Canterbury representative, had instant success with the side and only narrowly lost the final against East Coast 21–25. 2001 looked like North Otago's season, winning all of its seven games. However, in the final it was a disappointing four-point loss to South Canterbury 16–20. 2002 saw the North Otago Rugby Union celebrate its 75th jubilee and it indeed appropriate that in the 75th year of its existence the side should take the third division title beating Horowhenua 43-19 before an ecstatic crowd. 2003 and the challenges of Division Two was very much a daunting task. However, the team responded magnificently and finished in the top four but lost the semi final to Hawke's Bay in Napier in controversial circumstances. The highlight of the season was a superb win against Counties-Manukau. 2004 saw North Otago once again playing above its weight making the semi finals before going down to Nelson Bays.

Club Rugby
North Otago Rugby Football Union is made up of six clubs who play against the Otago Metropolitan Premier Division 2 teams in a combined club competition before playing out for the local Citizens Shield:
Excelsior
Athletic
Kurow
Maheno
Old Boys
Valley
The North Otago Rugby Football Union clubs used to play against the South Canterbury club sides in a combined competition before the combined Otago competition.

North Otago also have two strong secondary school teams:
Waitaki Boys High School
Saint Kevins College

Representative Rugby

North Otago have handed out some upsets to teams in the past including a win over Australia 14–13 in 1962.

The highlight of the early 1990s was a Ranfurly Shield challenge in 1993 when Auckland brought the trophy on tour. The crowd went delirious after 5 minutes when Brent McEwan scored a try from a set move to give North Otago a 5–0 lead. However, the talent of Auckland then shone through and they scored 139 unanswered points. John Kirwan scored eight tries.

2002 saw the North Otago Rugby Football Union celebrate its 75th anniversary and it indeed appropriate that in the 75th year of its existence the side should take the third division title beating Horowhenua 43-19 before an ecstatic crowd. North Otago are currently the holders of the Hanan Shield.

In 2007, North Otago won the Meads Cup trophy in the Heartland Championship, defeating Wanganui 25–8.

Ranfurly Shield
Since North Otago were founded they have played in 15 Ranfurly Shield matches but are yet to win. North Otago played its first challenge on 27 August 1938 going down to Otago at Carisbrook by 12–0. Their most recent Shield challenge was on 28 August 2020 against Canterbury.

27 August 1938, Otago 12 North Otago 0
28 September 1946, Southland 15 North Otago 3 (halfback Viv Wright kicked a penalty)
27 September 1947, Otago 42 North Otago 3 (70 metre try to winger Mort Fountain)
21 August 1971, Canterbury 14 North Otago 0
1 September 1973, Marlborough 26 North Otago 9 (Paddy Ford kicked two penalties and Jeff Gardiner a 55-metre field goal)
31 August 1974, South Canterbury 9 North Otago 3 (Paddy Ford kicked a penalty)
20 July 1983, Canterbury 88 North Otago 0
1 September 1993, Auckland 139 North Otago 5 (Brent McEwan, 1 try)
8 July 2000, Waikato 95 North Otago 17 (Dean Paterson 1 try, Simon Porter 4 penalties )
2003, Canterbury 85 North Otago 24 (Campbell Mackenzie, Pila Fifita, Scott Mayhew and Mike Mavor scoring tries, Michael Ruthven and Tevita Asi kicking conversions)
2008, Auckland 113 North Otago 3 (Nathan Cunningham penalty)
9 July 2010, Southland 48 North Otago 3
2 July 2011, Canterbury 52 North Otago 8
26 July 2019, North Otago 14 Otago 49
28 August 2020, Canterbury 71 North Otago 7

Hanan Shield
The Hanan Shield is one of the most prestigious trophies in New Zealand's domestic rugby union competition. First played for in 1946, the Hanan Shield is based on a challenge system played between North Otago, South Canterbury and Mid Canterbury. North Otago's best win was in 1997 when they defeated South Canterbury 20–17 to bring the Hanan Shield back to North Otago for the first time in 30 years.

North Otago in Super Rugby

North Otago, along with Otago and Southland, make up the Highlanders team that competes in the Super Rugby competition against other New Zealand teams, as well as Australian and South African teams.

North Otago 2002 season
Still getting over the loss of the 2001 Division 3 NPC final against South Canterbury, North Otago set out to play harder, faster, and more superb rugby in 2002, And that is exactly what they did. Starting their season off with a Hanan Shield match against Mid Canterbury, winning the game 43–16. For the first match of the NPC season they played West Coast. North Otago hardly let the coasters have the ball and eased to a 60–6 victory. South Canterbury had the home advantage for the next match but North Otago were still haunted by the memories of 2001 and it showed, North Otago sealing the game 39-9 and also taking the Lochore Cup off them.  Back home with the shields and cups, North Otago showed Buller who was boss and a 38–15 win was created. A trip up to Waikanae to play Horowhenua-Kapiti was good for the boys and even better was the 40–0 at the end of the 80 minutes. Back home for their next two games and sitting nicely at the top of the standings they had nothing to worry about. Wanganui tried but failed to win, North Otago running away with the game 73–7. Poverty Bay came and went with nothing, scoring five tries but still not good enough losing to North Otago 49–32. Masterton was the next venue for North Otago against Wairarapa-Bush But the locals were unable to cause an upset North Otago winning 27–14. A Quick trip to Taupo to play King Country and almost repeating their last game's score winning 27–16. So North Otago were into the semi finals. And again having to play South Canterbury in a final. But North Otago provided way to strong winning the match 58–10. So North Otago secured a home final and had to play Horowhenua-Kapiti. With conditions not quite what players and fans had hoped for, North Otago started pulling. Horowhenua-Kapiti tried to get back in the game but North Otago were playing a higher grade of rugby and when the referee blew his whistle to end the match, North Otago had won the title they had been waiting more than four years to get, winning the match 43–19.

North Otago 2007 season
Since winning the third division title in 2002 North Otago has punched well above its weight making the 2nd Division semi finals in 2003,04, and 2005 but losing all three. In 2006 they entered the Heartland Championship but again losing in the semi-final. But 2007 was a new year and north otago were focused on making the final. North Otago's first game was against buller in Oamaru. Buller managed to get 20 points in but North Otago more than doubled their score taking it away 51–20. A trip to Gisbourne and another win north otago beating Poverty Bay 31–11.
North Otago went back home for a Hanan Shield defence against South Cantbury, and continued in their winning streak beating SC 26–7. Another home game another win North Otago beating East Coast 38–5.
It was then off to play Wanganui. The Wanganui crowd cheered their team on but their cheering could not prevent North Otago's 39–16 win. King Country came down to play but they never got in the game and North Otago cruised out to a 52–5 lead. Wairarapa Bush tried hard and only just bet North Otago 15–7. One more pool match for North Otago to play and another home game. The crowd came to watch North Otago win but the win never came, Mid-Canterbury took the game and earned the 25–22 win.
 But the season was not over. North Otago had secured a home semi-final and it was against Wairarapa Bush. Last time the teams faced it was Wairarapa who won, but this time (with the help of loyal locals) North Otago showed the public who was stronger and won the match 30–13. So it was into the finals for North Otago. The conditions were perfect and the local Oamaru people had come out in force to wish their team well. North Otago played hard but so did Wanganui. And the game looked like it may have gone Wanganuis way. But North Otago stayed strong and then turned up the heat winning the Heartland Championship Meads Cup Final 25-8

Notable players

All Blacks
There have only been two players selected for the All Blacks whilst playing their club rugby in North Otago.

In 1965 and 1966 Ian (Spooky) Smith, who played for the Old Boys Club was selected for tests against South Africa and Campbell Lamberton's Lions.

Kurow's Phil Gard was selected for the All Blacks in 1971 when he played the fourth and final test against the British Lions and was on the All Blacks 1972 internal tour.

All Blacks born in the North Otago region
Ian Hurst
Richie McCaw

Other Notable Players

 Mike Mavor
 Barry Fox
 Pila Fifita (1st person in any NPC Division to score 3 tries in a final),(Heartland squad),(Tongan National Side)
 Fepikou Tatafu (Tongan RWC squad 1999)
 Campbell Mackenzie (NZ Divisional XV 04,05)
 Scott Mayhew (Heartland Squad)
 Kilifi Fangupo (Heartland Squad)
 Ross Hay (Heartland Squad)
 Tom Wood (England National Side)
 Hotili Asi (NPC Player of the year, Tongan National Side, First Division England Rugby, Tasman Makos)
 Matt Saunders (Highlanders, Otago NPC & Southland NPC)
 Billy Guyton (Heartland Squad, Tasman NPC, Hurricanes, Crusaders & Blues Super Rugby teams)
 Matt Faddes (Highlanders, Otago ITM Cup, All Black sevens)
 Steven Sasagi (U21 Samoa)
 Sekonaia Kalou  (Flying Fijians rep and also represented Fiji in volleyball, netball & basketball.

Championships
North Otago won the 3rd Division title in 2002 with a 43–19 win against Horowhenua-Kapiti, which took them into the 2nd Division for the 2003 season.
And in 2007 North Otago won the Heartland Championship beating Wanganui 25–8, and also beat Wanganui in the 2010 final 39–18. All Finals were played at Centennial Park in Oamaru.

Heartland Championship placings

Club Rugby

Citizens Shield 
The Citizens Shield is North Otago's Premier Men's senior club competition. First awarded in 1903, with the Oamaru Football Club the inaugural holders, it has been played for annually ever since with the only brief breaks happening during World War 1 and 2.

Sponsors
Summit Wool Spinners Limited
Speight's
McKeown Petroleum
Plunket Electrical
Meridian Energy
Totara Hotels
R Redpath Limited
David Ovens Builder
Whitestone Contracting Limited
Samurai Sportswear

References

External links
 Official site
 See also North Otago in the 2008 Heartland Championship

New Zealand rugby union teams
New Zealand rugby union governing bodies
Sport in Otago
Sports organizations established in 1904
Sport in Oamaru